Mactan Island Aquarium is a public aquarium in Lapu-Lapu, Cebu.

The aquarium museum has been open since October 2008 and has over 30 exhibits showcasing Cebu's aquatic life from snakes to sharks.

The aquarium has recently completed a transfer from Barangay Basak to Barangay Maribago, still on Mactan Island.  The new larger site is between White Sands Resort and EGI City by the Sea Condos.

External links
 
 Mactan Island Aquarium

Aquaria in the Philippines
Buildings and structures in Lapu-Lapu City
Tourist attractions in Cebu
Articles needing infobox zoo